Bewitched has been released on DVD in a number of countries by Sony Pictures Entertainment.

North America

Australia

United Kingdom

Japan

References

 
Bewitched